The 2017 Senior Bowl was an all-star college football exhibition game featuring players from the 2016 NCAA Division I FBS football season, and prospects for the 2017 Draft of the professional National Football League (NFL). The game concluded the post-season that began on December 17, 2016. It was sponsored by Reese's Peanut Butter Cups and is officially known as the Reese's Senior Bowl. The game was coached by John Fox of the Chicago Bears and Hue Jackson of the Cleveland Browns.

The Game was played on January 28, 2017, at 1:30 p.m. CST, at Ladd–Peebles Stadium in Mobile, Alabama, between "North" and "South" teams. Coverage of the event was provided by NFL Network.

Rosters
The entire roster was announced on January 18. Western Michigan's Corey Davis was unable to attend the Senior Bowl after suffering a shoulder injury.

North Team

South Team

Game summary

Scoring summary

Statistics

References

Senior Bowl
Senior Bowl
January 2017 sports events in the United States
Senior Bowl